Feyzabad-e Sofla may refer to:
 Feyzabad-e Sofla, Kerman
 Feyzabad-e Sofla, Yazd